Olli Pekka Soinio (27 November 1948 – 29 November 2018) was a Finnish film director, screenwriter, and film editor.

Selected filmography as director
 Aidankaatajat eli heidän jälkeensä vedenpaisumus (1982)
 The Moonlight Sonata (1988)
 Legenda (1989)
 Moonlight Sonata II: The Street Sweepers (1991)
 Rolli: Amazing Tales (1991)
 Yötuuli (1992)
 Pako punaisten päämajasta (2000)

External links
 

Finnish film directors
Finnish screenwriters
1948 births
2018 deaths